Hellinsia ruminahuii is a moth of the family Pterophoridae. It is found in Ecuador.

The wingspan is 21 mm. The forewings are straw-yellow and the markings are pale brown. The hindwings and fringes are pale brown-grey. Adults are on wing in March, at an altitude of 2,480 meters.

Etymology
The species is named after the Inca general Ruminahui.

References

Moths described in 2011
ruminahuii
Moths of South America